Phytoecia ferrugata is a species of beetle in the family Cerambycidae. It was described by Ganglbauer in 1884.

Subspecies
 Phytoecia ferrugata ferrugata Ganglbauer, 1884
 Phytoecia ferrugata dilaticollis Pic, 1900

References

Phytoecia
Beetles described in 1884